Sumit Nagar (born 22 October 1998) is an Indian cricketer. He made his List A debut on 24 September 2019, for Arunachal Pradesh in the 2019–20 Vijay Hazare Trophy.

References

External links
 

1998 births
Living people
Indian cricketers
Arunachal Pradesh cricketers
Place of birth missing (living people)